Rizki Juniansyah (born 17 June 2003) is an Indonesian weightlifter. He won the silver medal in the men's 73kg event at the 2022 World Weightlifting Championships held in Bogotá, Colombia. He won the gold medal in the men's 73kg event at the 2021 Islamic Solidarity Games held in Konya, Turkey.

In 2021, he won the gold medal in the men's 73kg event at the Junior World Weightlifting Championships held in Tashkent, Uzbekistan. He also won the gold medal in his event at the 2022 Junior World Weightlifting Championships held in Heraklion, Greece. He also set a new junior world record in the Snatch with a lift of 156 kg.

Major results

References

External links 
 

Living people
2003 births
Place of birth missing (living people)
Indonesian male weightlifters
Southeast Asian Games medalists in weightlifting
Southeast Asian Games silver medalists for Indonesia
Competitors at the 2021 Southeast Asian Games
Islamic Solidarity Games competitors for Indonesia
Islamic Solidarity Games medalists in weightlifting
World Weightlifting Championships medalists
21st-century Indonesian people